Paraplectana is a genus of Asian and African orb-weaver spiders first described by F. de Brito Capello in 1867.

Species
 it contains thirteen species:
Paraplectana coccinella (Thorell, 1890) – Myanmar, Indonesia (Nias Is.)
Paraplectana duodecimmaculata Simon, 1897 – Indonesia (Java)
Paraplectana gravelyi (Tikader, 1961) – India
Paraplectana hemisphaerica (C. L. Koch, 1844) – Sierra Leone
Paraplectana kittenbergeri Caporiacco, 1947 – Tanzania
Paraplectana multimaculata Thorell, 1899 – Cameroon, East Africa
Paraplectana rajashree Ahmed, Sumukha, Khalap, Mohan & Jadhav, 2015 – India
Paraplectana sakaguchii Uyemura, 1938 – China, Korea, Japan
Paraplectana thorntoni (Blackwall, 1865) – Central Africa, Yemen
Paraplectana t. occidentalis Strand, 1916 – West, Central Africa
Paraplectana tsushimensis Yamaguchi, 1960 – China, Taiwan, Japan
Paraplectana walleri (Blackwall, 1865) – West, Central Africa, Madagascar
Paraplectana w. ashantensis Strand, 1907 – Ghana

References

Araneidae
Araneomorphae genera
Spiders of Africa
Spiders of Asia